Mediaset España Comunicación, S.A. (doing business as Mediaset España), formerly known as Gestevisión Telecinco, S.A., is a Spanish media company, controlled by the Italian company MFE — MediaForEurope. Its divisions include the generalist free-to-air TV channels Telecinco and Cuatro, thematic channels and a film production subsidiary, Telecinco Cinema.

Created in 1989 as Gestevisión Telecinco, it was then granted one of the first licenses for private free-to-air analogic terrestrial TV broadcasting in Spain. In 2011, the media conglomerate was renamed to Mediaset España Comunicación S.A. PRISA eventually sold its remaining shares in 2015.

History

1989–1993: The early years
Gestevisión Telecinco was established on 10 March 1989, to participate in the government auction of broadcasting licenses announced by Felipe González's government following the Ley de Televisión Privada (Law of Commercial Television). Its first president was Germán Sánchez Ruipérez and, with a capital of 250 million pesetas, its shareholding was distributed as follows:

 Fininvest, presided by Silvio Berlusconi (25%);
 Divercisa, belonging to the Organización Nacional de Ciegos de España (ONCE), presided by Miguel Durán (25%);
 Sociedad Europea de Comunicación e Información (CECISA), belonging to Ediciones Anaya, presided by Germán Sánchez Ruipérez (25%);
 Juan Fernández Montreal, owner of Chocolates Trapa (15%);
 Promociones Calle Mayor, of the property developer Ángel Medrano Cuesta (10%).

On 25 August 1989 Gestevisión Telecinco, along with Antena 3 Televisión and PRISA TV, were issued a 10-year broadcasting license to operate a national, free-to-air, commercial television channel. On 3 March 1990 Tele5 (as it was known then) began its initial broadcast.

In 1997 Silvio Berlusconi's Mediaset acquired the majority of shares in Telecinco.

The main director of Atlas, Chema Baptist, added maximum responsibility of Telecinco's internet area and new business multiplatform to his duties. This decision was part of the company's policy of harnessing content creation and management in new technologies, and it took place immediately after the repurchase of 50% of his internet branch was finalised by Orange in 2001.

In 1998, after the arrival of Paolo Vasile as Chief executive officer, Telecinco became more prominent in Spain. On 10 March 2000, the Spanish government renewed the concession for a further 10 years.

Gestevisión Telecinco was listed on the stock exchange on 24 June 2004.

2009–present: Telecinco-Cuatro merger
On December 18, 2009, Mediaset, the controlling shareholder of Gestevisión Telecinco, and PRISA, parent company of Sogecable, presented an agreement to merge their television operations (Telecinco and Cuatro). Following this merger, Cuatro would be purchased in full by Telecinco. As part of the deal, PRISA would buy newly issued shares of Gestevisión Telecinco, giving it an 18% stake in the company.

This agreement made Gestevisión Telecinco the largest television network in Spain by audience share. In total the group would operate eight free-to-air channels: Telecinco, Cuatro, LaSiete, FactoríaDeFicción, LaNueve, CNN+ and CincoShop.

The board of directors of the enlarged Gestevisión Telecinco (which will keep the brands and editorial structure of both Telecinco and Cuatro) has Alejandro Echevarria as a chairman and Juan Luis Cebrián as a vicechairman, both non-executives; with two CEOs, Paolo Vasile (programming) and Giuseppe Tringali (advertising). PRISA also has two CEOs and nominates the vice-chairman of the operator.

As part of the agreement, Gestevisión Telecinco will take a 22% shareholding in the Digital+ platform.

On 11 March 2011 following the purchase of Cuatro and the creation of its newest channel, Divinity, the company informed the Comisión Nacional del Mercado de Valores to amend the corporate name of the company from Gestevision Telecinco to Mediaset España Comunicación.

Mediaset is a supporter of the Hybrid Broadcast Broadband TV (HbbTV) initiative that is promoting and establishing an open European standard for hybrid set-top boxes for the reception of broadcast TV and broadband multimedia applications with a single user interface, and has run pilot HbbTV services.

In 2022, after a bid for the 44% pool of shares it did not already hold, Italian Mediaset (rebranded as MFE — MediaForEurope) completed the takeover of Mediaset España, ending up with roughly a 83% of shares of the company, with the following stated goal being the full merger of Spanish operations with the Milan-based company.

In November 2022, Mediaset España disclosed a restructuring of its senior management, with the appointment of Alessandro Salem and Massimo Musolino as the company's new CEOs, respectively tasked with the areas of Advertising, and Management & Operations, as well as the delegation of certain executive powers in the area of External & Institutional Relations to chairman Borja Prado.

Ownership
As of June 2021, Mediaset España's shares are primarily owned by MFE — MediaForEurope (55.69%). The rest of shares is free float (44.31%).

Group responsibilities
 Grupo Editorial Tele 5, S.A.U. (Spain)
 Agencia de Televisión Latino-Americana de Servicios y Noticias España, S.A.U. (Spain)
 Telecinco Cinema, S.A.U. (Spain)
 , S.A.U.  (Spain)
 Cinematext Media, S.A. (Spain)
 Conecta 5 Telecinco, S.A.U. (Spain)
 Mediacinco Cartera, S.L. (Spain)
 Canal Factoría de Ficción, S.A.U. (Spain)
 Atlas Media, S.A.U. (Spain) — News agency responsible for providing news content for Telecinco's daily news bulletins.
 Agencia de Televisión Latino-Americana de Servicios y Noticias País Vasco, S.A.U. (Spain)
 MiCartera Media, S.A.U. (Spain)
 Publimedia Gestión, S.A.U. (Spain)
 Advanced Media, S.A.U. (Spain)
 Cinematext Media Italia, S.R.L. (Italy)
 Telecinco Factoría de Producción, S.L.U. (Spain)
 Sociedad General de Televisión Cuatro, S.A. (Spain) — Defunct subsidiary responsible for operating Cuatro.
 Compañía Independiente de Noticias de Televisión, S.A. (Spain) — News agency responsible for providing content for the now defunct CNN+ news channel.
 Sogecable Media, S.L. (Spain)

Channels

Current
Domestic
 Telecinco, Telecinco HD
 Cuatro, Cuatro HD
 Factoría de Ficción
 Boing (50% with Warner Bros. Discovery) 
 Divinity
 Energy
 Be Mad
International
 CincoMAS

Former
 LaSiete
 Nueve

References

External links

 
Television networks in Spain
.
Mass media companies of Spain
Spanish-language television networks
Television companies of Spain
Mass media in Madrid
Companies based in the Community of Madrid
Mass media companies established in 1989
Spanish companies established in 1989
Companies listed on the Madrid Stock Exchange
Spanish brands